Témoris is a town and seat of the municipality of Guazapares, in the northern Mexican state of Chihuahua. As of 2010, the town had a population of 2,053, up from 1,639 as of 2005. Temoris is a stop on the Copper Canyon Railway.

References

Populated places in Chihuahua (state)